In the sport of athletics, international competitions between national teams can be distinguished into four main types:
 Multi-sport events, commonly referred to as games, where athletics events form part of a wider sporting programme
 World championships, the primary competitions where all nations may compete
 Continental or regional championships, between nations of a specific geographical area
 Competitions where the invited nations or athletes are from a shared community, typically based on language, religion, ethnicity, occupation or political allegiance

Competitions between athletes of different nations which do not feature team selection at national or continental level, such as the Diamond League, are excluded.

Single-sport competitions

Athletics at multi-sport events

See also
List of multi-sport events

References

International Athletics Championships, Games and Cups. GBR Athletics. Retrieved 2019-10-08.

 *
 *
Athletics